Events from the year 1229 in Ireland.

Incumbent
Lord: Henry III

Events
 Philip de Barry founded Ballybeg Priory for the Canons Regular of St Augustine.
 Shankill Castle built by Archbishop Henry de Loundres on the site of the ancient Shankill church.

Births

Deaths
Gilla an Choimded Ó Duillénnáin, a cleric.

References

 
1220s in Ireland
Ireland
Years of the 13th century in Ireland